Full-Time: Vancouver's Soccer Show is a now defunct two-hour soccer radio program broadcast Sunday nights at 9 pm on the TEAM 1040 Sports Radio in Vancouver, BC, Canada. The show was hosted by Tyler Green and Mike Martignago. The show debuted on June 29, 2008, as a once a month soccer show. Soon afterwards, it was expanded to a one-hour weekly program and in June of 2009, expanded yet again to a two-hour program.

According to the show's website: "Full-Time features leading soccer analysts from Europe and North America, along with players, coaches and managers from around the world in a fast-paced sports talk format, with entertaining interviews and informative segments."
 
Notable guests included:
Clarence Seedorf,
Phil Brown,
Andy Dawson,
Paul Stalteri,
Stewart Robson,
David Edgar,
Asmir Begović,
Dale Mitchell,
Landon Donovan

References

Canadian sports radio programs